6 Armoured Close Support Battalion REME is a battalion of the Royal Electrical and Mechanical Engineers of the British Army.

History
The battalion was formed in 1992, at Bordon, from 3 Field Company, and 15 Field Company. Its initial role was to provide close equipment support to 3rd (United Kingdom) Division. One company deployed on Operation Telic 10 in 2007, just after the battalion moved to Tidworth Camp.

In September 2021, a platoon of 22 troops joined the 4th Armoured CS Battalion REME to provide public duties in London.  This was the first time the corps has provided public duties for more than 30 years.

Future Soldier
Under the Future Soldier reforms, the battalion is due to re-subordinate to the 1st Deep Recce Strike Brigade Combat Team after its formation.

Structure
The battalion's current structure is as follows:
3 Armoured Company
13 Field Company
14 Armoured Company

References

Battalions of the Royal Electrical and Mechanical Engineers
Military units and formations established in 1992